Libyan conflict may refer to:

2011 Libyan Civil War
Chadian–Libyan conflict
Libyan–Sudanese conflict 
Libyan–Egyptian War